Beyond Good and Evil is the seventh studio album by English rock band The Cult. Released in 2001, it marked their first new recording in six and a half years. The record debuted at No. 37 on the charts in the United States, No. 22 in Canada, No. 25 in Spain.

Only one single, "Rise", was officially released and had a music video. The songs "Breathe" and "True Believers" were released as promotional singles but not as official singles.

This album marked the return of Matt Sorum as The Cult's drummer. Although Sorum had previously toured with the band on the Sonic Temple tour in 1989 and 1990, this was the first time that he had recorded a studio album with the band. It is the only Cult album to feature Sorum.

Background and writing
The title of the record is a reference to Friedrich Nietzsche's 1886 book of the same title, and it briefly had the mock working title of Bring Me the Head of Dave Grohl, referencing the frontman of Foo Fighters, and also the former drummer of Nirvana. In 2006, singer Ian Astbury claimed via the band's website that his preferred choice for the record's title was Demon Process.

"My Bridges Burn" was originally titled "Save Me"; "Breathe" originally had the slightly longer title "Breathe (You Bastard)" along with an overdub of keyboards after the guitar solo which was later removed; and "Speed of Light" went through several different titles: originally titled "Black California", then "Who Plays the Devil" before the band decided on its final title.

There are several CD acetates of early recordings of the songs later featured on Beyond Good and Evil. A CD-R of demo versions of the songs leaked out, unofficially referred to as Unmixed, Unmastered, Unsequenced, and a bootleg CD-R of later, but still unfinished versions of the songs are also in circulation.

Track listing
All songs written by Ian Astbury and Billy Duffy, except where noted.
 "War (The Process)" - 4:12 
 "The Saint" - 3:36
 "Rise" - 3:39
 "Take the Power" - 3:55
 "Breathe" (Astbury, Duffy, Mick Jones, Marti Frederiksen) - 4:59
 "Nico" - 4:49
 "American Gothic" - 3:56
 "Ashes and Ghosts" (Astbury, Duffy, Bob Rock) - 5:00
 "Shape the Sky" - 3:29
 "Speed of Light" (Astbury, Duffy, Rock) - 4:22
 "True Believers" - 5:07
 "My Bridges Burn" - 3:51

Different bonus tracks were added in certain regions:

13. "Libertine" (Bonus track - in Australia and Japan)

Other versions
 In mainland China, this record was issued in a cardboard foldout sleeve.
 In Taiwan, it was released with an obi strip.
 "Nico" was incorrectly listed as "Niko" on some German CD pressings.
 In Australia, a six-song demo disc was given to record company executives.
 A promotional disc was released in a slimline plastic CD case in Germany, with a completely different front cover.

Personnel
Ian Astbury - vocals
Billy Duffy - guitar
Matt Sorum - drums, percussion
Martyn LeNoble - bass on tracks 5, 10, 11, 12
Chris Wyse - bass on tracks 1, 2, 3, 4, 6, 7, 8, 9, 13

References

The Cult albums
2001 albums
Atlantic Records albums
Albums produced by Bob Rock